Raúl Beceyro (b. 1944) is a movie director, critic and photographer from Argentina.
He is known for the movie Nadie Nada Nunca (No, No, Never – 1998) that he produced and directed, based on the novel of the same name by Juan Jose Saer. The movie starred Antonio Germano, Marina Vasquez and Alicia Dolinsky.
He met and was inspired by Saer in 1962 when Saer was his teacher at the Instituto de Cine de Santa Fe.

His book History of photography in 10 images, published in the 1980s, discussed photographs not just in terms of technique or aesthetics but also in terms of what the images say or represent.
From 1985 he has headed the Film Workshop of the Universidad Nacional del Litoral in Santa Fe.
His book "Fotogramas Santafesinos. Instituto de Cinematografía de la UNL, 1956–1976" is a retrospective of this institution dedicated to the lost students.
He has made several documentary movies about different aspects of Santa Fe, where he lives, including one on the constitutional convention held in the town, and one on the 2007 elections.

Films

Beceyro worked in various roles in the Argentinian movie industry:
 Writer and assistant director of Palo y hueso (1968), directed by Nicolás Sarquís, based on a short story by Juan Jose Saer
 Writer, producer and director of Nadie Nada Nunca (1998), also based on a  story by Juan Jose Saer
 Sound for Nadar contra la corriente (2002) and Bienal (2004)
 Writer and director of Guadalupe / Imágenes de Santa Fe 1 (2000)
 Writer and director of Jazz / Imágenes de Santa Fe 2 (2005).
 Writer and director of 2007. Imágenes de Santa Fe 3 (2008)
 Self-published documentaries La noche de las cámaras despiertas (2002) and Dirigido por... (2005)

Books

References

Argentine film directors
Living people
1944 births